Ali Ahmad Al-Diwan (1 July 1968 – 18 June 2006), was an Iraqi international footballer who played midfielder, spent the majority of his career with Al-Minaa club. He is son of former international multi-sports player Ahmed Al-Diwan.

Death due to serious illness
Ali was ill with a severe disease that lasted several years until he died on June 18, 2006.

Sporting events in honor of Al-Diwan
On March 3, 2013 the Martyr Al-Hakim Foundation for youth and sport and in collaboration with The youth and sport province of Basra established sports championship football on behalf of the players: Nazar Abdul Zahra and Ali Al-Diwan, the first match was among the pioneers of Al-Zawraa team led by Falah Hassan and pioneers of Al-Minaa team led by Jalil Hanoon, where 36 teams participated in this tournament.

References

External links
A commemorative word on the death of player Ali Al-Diwan
Al-Minaa Club: Sailors of south

1968 births
2006 deaths
Iraqi footballers
Iraq international footballers
Association football midfielders
Sportspeople from Basra
Al-Bahri players
Al-Mina'a SC players